The 2023 Austin Peay Governors football team will represent Austin Peay State University during the 2023 NCAA Division I FCS football season as a member of the ASUN–WAC Football Conference. They are led by fourth-year head coach Scotty Walden and play their games at Fortera Stadium in Clarksville, Tennessee.

Previous season

The Governors finished the 2022 season with a record of 7–4, 3–2 in ASUN Conference play to finish in a tie for second in the ASUN.

After the 2022 season, the ASUN and the Western Athletic Conference (WAC), which had been partners in a football-only alliance in the 2021 and 2022 seasons, jointly announced that they would merge their football leagues.

Schedule

References

Austin Peay
Austin Peay Governors football seasons
Austin Peay Governors football